The members of the 22nd Manitoba Legislature of Manitoba were elected in the Manitoba general election held in October 1945. The legislature sat from February 19, 1946, to September 29, 1949.

A coalition government of the Liberal-Progressive Party, the Progressive Conservative Party and the Social Credit League held a majority of seats in the assembly. Stuart Garson served as Premier until 1948, when he entered federal politics. Douglas Lloyd Campbell succeeded Garson as Premier.

Seymour Farmer of the Co-operative Commonwealth Federation was Leader of the Opposition. Farmer resigned as party leader in 1947 and was replaced by Edwin Hansford.

In 1948, the Labour Relations Act was passed. It was intended to protect both employers and employees, and established the Manitoba Labour Board to deal with labour disputes.

Robert Hawkins served as speaker for the assembly.

There were four sessions of the 22nd Legislature:

Roland Fairbairn McWilliams was Lieutenant Governor of Manitoba.

Members of the Assembly 
The following members were elected to the assembly in 1945:

Notes:

By-elections 
By-elections were held to replace members for various reasons:

Notes:

References 

Terms of the Manitoba Legislature
1946 establishments in Manitoba
1949 disestablishments in Manitoba